Snežana Pantić (Serbian Cyrillic: Снежана Пантић; nee Perić; 18 June 1978 – 9 February 2022) was a Serbian professional karate competitor and the most successful Serbian female karateka.

Biography
Born in Zrenjanin, SR Serbia, SFR Yugoslavia, she resided in Belgrade.

Pantić married FK Partizan goalkeeper Đorđe Pantić in 2006. They had a daughter, Marija  "Manja" born 2007. Pantić was a member of Athlete Commission in World Karate Federation.

She died from breast cancer on 9 February 2022, at the age of 43.

Achievements

2006 results

 1st place European Championships (Stavanger, Norway), open category
 3rd place European Championships (Stavanger, Norway), team
 3rd place World Championships (Tampere, Finland), open category

2005 results

 1st place Mediterranean Games (Almería, Spain),-60 kg category
 2nd place European championships (Tenerife, Spain) open category
 1st place World Games (Duisburg, Germany) -60 kg category

2004 results

 2nd place European Championships (Moscow, Russia) -60 kg category
 3rd place European Championships (Moscow, Russia) open category
 2nd place University World Championships (Belgrade, Serbia)

2003 results

 2nd place European Championships, team, (Bremen, Germany)
 1st place Yugoslavian Championships, open category
 1st place European Club Championships with karate club "Dijamant" (Oviedo, Spain)
 1st place Zagreb Karate Fest – Top Ten (open weight)

2002 results

 1st place World Championships (Madrid, Spain), open category
 2nd place European Championships (Tallinn, Estonia), team
 3rd place Mediterranean Championships (Rijeka, Croatia) -60 kg category
 3rd place University World Championships (Puebla, Mexico) -60 kg category
 2nd place University World Championships (Puebla, Mexico), team
 1st place European Club Championships, with karate club "Dijamant" (Giör, Hungary)

2001 results

 2nd place European Club Championships, with karate club "Dijamant" (Istanbul, Turkey)
 3rd place Mediterranean Games, (Tunis, Tunis), -60 kg category

2000 results

 1st place Yugoslavian Championship, -60 kg category
 2nd place University World Championship, Kyoto, [Japan],team
 2nd place European Championships (Istanbul, Turkey) team

1999 results

 1st place Yugoslavian Championships, -60 kg and open category
 3rd place European Championships (Chalkida, Greece), -60 kg category

References

External links
 Snežana Pantić's website
 Profile in Ilustrovana Politika

1978 births
2022 deaths
Sportspeople from Zrenjanin
Serbian female karateka
European champions for Serbia
Mediterranean Games bronze medalists for Yugoslavia
Competitors at the 2001 Mediterranean Games
Competitors at the 2005 Mediterranean Games
World Games gold medalists
Mediterranean Games gold medalists for Serbia
Competitors at the 2005 World Games
Mediterranean Games medalists in karate
Deaths from breast cancer
Deaths from cancer in Serbia
21st-century Serbian women